"Power" is a song and single by German power metal band Helloween, taken from the album The Time of the Oath.

Single track listing

Personnel
Andi Deris - vocals
Roland Grapow - lead and rhythm guitars
Michael Weikath - lead and rhythm guitars
Markus Grosskopf - bass guitar
Uli Kusch - drums

Charts

References

1996 singles
Helloween songs